Donors Trust is an American nonprofit donor-advised fund. It was founded in 1999 with the goal of "safeguarding the intent of libertarian and conservative donors".  As a donor advised fund, Donors Trust is not legally required to disclose the identity of its donors, and most of its donors remain anonymous. It distributes funds to various conservative and libertarian organizations, and has been characterized as the "dark money ATM" of the political right.

It is affiliated with Donors Capital Fund, another donor-advised fund. In September 2015, Lawson Bader was announced as the new president of both Donors Trust and Donors Capital Fund. Bader was formerly president of the Competitive Enterprise Institute and Vice President at the Mercatus Center.

Overview
Donors Trust is a 501(c)(3) organization. As a public charity and a donor-advised fund, Donors Trust offers clients a variety of tax advantages compared to a private foundation.

Donors Trust accepts donations from charitable foundations and individuals. Grants from Donors Trust are based on the preferences of the original contributor, and the organization assures clients that their contributions will never be used to support politically liberal causes. As a donor advised fund, Donors Trust can offer anonymity to individual donors, with respect to their donations to Donors Trust, as well as with respect to an individual donor's ultimate grantee.

As a donor advised fund and public charity, Donors Trust accepts cash or assets from donors, and in turn creates a separate account for the donor, who may recommend disbursements from the fund to other public charities. Donors Trust requires an initial deposit of $10,000 or more. Donors Trust is associated with Donors Capital Fund. Donors Trust refers clients to Donors Capital Fund if the client plans to maintain a balance of $1 million or more. Donors Trust president Lawson Bader said the goal of the organization is to "safeguard the intent of libertarian and conservative donors," ensuring that funds are used only to promote "liberty through limited government, responsibility, and free enterprise".

History
Donors Trust was established in 1999 by Whitney Lynn Ball. According to Donors Trust, the organization was founded by a group of donors and nonprofit executives who were "actively engaged in supporting and promoting a free society as understood in America's founding documents."  A major selling point to donors is that even after their death, their money will continue to fund conservative/libertarian goals, and not change based on the attitudes of their heirs or trustees as a family foundation might.

In early 2013, Donors Trust was the subject of reports by The Independent, The Guardian, Mother Jones, and the Center for Public Integrity. Mother Jones described Donors Trust as having funded a conservative public policy agenda in the areas of labor unions, climate science, public schools, and economic regulations.

In January 2021, CNBC reported that in 2019, Donors Trust had given millions of dollars to conservative organizations that went on to push claims of election fraud in the 2020 election.

Donors
As of 2013, Donors Trust had 193 contributors, mostly individuals, and some foundations.

The Charles G. Koch Foundation contributed millions to Donors Trust since the mid-2000s. The Koch brothers, Charles and David Koch, were the top contributors to Donors Trust in 2011, according to an analysis by the Columbia Journalism Review published by Columbia University Graduate School of Journalism. In 2010, Donors Trust received a 2 million grant from the Donors Capital Fund.

Donors Trust account holders have included the John M. Olin Foundation, the Castle Rock Foundation, the Searle Freedom Trust, and the Bradley Foundation. The Bradley family contributed $650,000 between 2001 and 2010. The DeVos family foundation contributed $1 million in 2009 and $1.5 million in 2010 to Donors Trust.

Recipients
From its founding in 1999 through 2013, Donors Trust and Donors Capital Fund distributed nearly $400 million, and through 2015 $740 million, to various nonprofit organizations, including numerous conservative and libertarian causes. Donors Trust requires that recipients are registered with the US Internal Revenue Service as a 501(c)(3) public charity. Whitney Ball, the former president of the Trust, told The Guardian in 2013 that it has about 1,600 grantees. In 2014, Ball said that 70 to 75 percent of grants go to public policy organizations, with the rest going to more conventional charities such as social service and educational organizations.

In 2010, the Americans for Prosperity Foundation received a Donors Trust grant of $7 million, nearly half of the Foundation's revenue that year. Other Donors Trust recipients have included the Heritage Foundation, Americans for Tax Reform, the National Rifle Association Freedom Action Foundation, the Competitive Enterprise Institute, the Cato Institute,  the Federalist Society, the FreedomWorks Foundation,  the National Right to Work Legal Defense Foundation, and the Center for Class Action Fairness.

Donors Trust paid the legal fees of the Project on Fair Representation, a Washington, D.C.-based legal defense fund that assembled the plaintiff's legal team in Fisher v. University of Texas, a 2013 United States Supreme Court case concerning affirmative action college admissions policies. In 2011, the Franklin Center for Government and Public Integrity, an online news organization, received $6.3 million in Donors Trust and Donors Capital Fund grants, 95 percent of the center's revenue that year.

Other Donors Trust recipients have included the Foundation for Jewish Camp, Families Against Mandatory Minimums, the James Randi Educational Foundation, the Marijuana Policy Project, and PragerU.

Climate change related funding
Donors Trust and Donors Capital Fund distributed nearly $120 million to 102 think tanks and action groups skeptical of the science behind climate change between 2002 and 2010. According to a 2013 analysis by Drexel University environmental sociologist Robert Brulle, between 2003 and 2013 Donors Trust and Donors Capital Fund combined were the largest funders of organizations opposed to restrictions on carbon emissions, which Brulle calls the "climate change counter-movement." According to Brulle, by 2009, approximately one-quarter of the funding of the "climate counter-movement" was from the Donors Trust and Donors Capital Fund.

As of 2010, Donors Trust grants to conservative and libertarian organizations active in climate change issues included more than $17 million to the American Enterprise Institute, a think tank; $13.5 million to the Heartland Institute, a public policy think tank; and $11 million to Americans for Prosperity, a political advocacy group. In 2011, the Committee for a Constructive Tomorrow (CFACT), a conservative Washington, D.C.-based non-profit organization, received $1.2 million from Donors Trust, 40 percent of CFACT's revenue in that year. Climate change writer Wei-Hock "Willie" Soon  received hundreds of thousands of dollars from Donors Trust. In 2015, The Guardian reported that Donors Trust gave $4.3 million to the Competitive Enterprise Institute over three years.

State-based policy funding
Between 2008 and 2013, Donors Trust granted $10 million to the State Policy Network (SPN), a national network of conservative and libertarian think tanks focused on state-level policy. SPN used the grants to incubate new think tanks in Arkansas, Rhode Island and Florida. Donors Trust also issued grants to SPN's affiliates at the state level during the same period. The American Legislative Exchange Council, a nonprofit organization of conservative state legislators and private sector representatives that drafts and shares model state-level legislation, is a Donors Trust recipient.

Project Veritas 

The organization donated $1.7 million to Project Veritas, a far-right group run by conservative activist James O'Keefe, which attempts to use deceptively edited undercover videos to create the impression of bias in mainstream media organizations and liberal groups. Donors Trust's relationship with Project Veritas came under scrutiny in 2017 after Project Veritas had one of its operatives contact The Washington Post, falsely claiming to have been impregnated by Roy Moore while she was a teenager.

Elections and the judiciary 
In 2018, the organization funded more than 99% of the Judicial Education Project, a legal alias for Honest Elections Project and The 85 Fund.

Board of directors 
The board of directors of Donors Trust includes:
 Kimberly Dennis, chairman – president of the Searle Freedom Trust
 Lawson Bader, president and CEO – Donors Trust and Donors Capital Fund
 James Piereson, vice chairman – conservative scholar and president of the William E. Simon Foundation
 Thomas E. Beach
 George G.H. Coates Jr. – chairman of the Commonwealth Foundation for Public Policy Alternatives

See also 
 Citizens for Self-Governance
 Convention of States Project
 Leonard Leo
 Open the States & Convention of States Action

References

External links
 
 Organizational Profile – National Center for Charitable Statistics (Urban Institute)
 Nonprofit Explorer – Donors Trust Inc, archive of federal disclosures maintained by ProPublica

Non-profit organizations based in Alexandria, Virginia
Charities based in Virginia
Organizations established in 1999
Conservative organizations in the United States
1999 establishments in Virginia